TSUI Ming-sum is Professor and Felizberta Lo Padilla Tong Dean of Social Sciences, Caritas Institute of Higher Education (CIHE), Hong Kong. He is also adjunct/honorary professor of seven other universities. Before joining CIHE, he was Professor of Social Work and Associate Dean, Faculty of Health and Social Sciences, the Hong Kong Polytechnic University. Ming-sum has 40 years of experience in practising, researching, and teaching social work practice. Before joining the Hong Kong Polytechnic University, he was Service Supervisor of Development and Health Services of Hong Kong Christian Service. Ming-sum has set up the first community-based family service centre, the first counselling centre for psychotropic substance abusers and the first employee assistance program in Hong Kong. He also supervised the Hong Kong Eye Bank Clinic and coordinated the program development, fund raising, service evaluation, and staff development of Hong Kong Christian Service in the 1980s.

Ming-sum received his MSW from McGill University as a top student and earned his PhD from the University of Toronto on three scholarships. He is also a member of the Academy of Certified Social Workers (ACSW), the first international member of Certified Social Work Managers, USA (CSWM), a member of the Chartered Management Institute (MCMI), a Fellow of the Hong Kong Professional Counselling Association (FHKPCA) and Hong Kong Institute of Human Resource Management (FIHRM). As an expert in social work supervision, Ming-sum is the consultant in social work supervision for China National Association of Social Workers, Hong Kong SAR Government, Singapore Association of Social Workers and Hong Kong Social Workers Association. At the Hong Kong Polytechnic University, Ming-sum has set up three academic programs: BA (Hons) in Social Policy & Administration, Master of Social Work (MSW) and the first Doctor of Social Work (DSW) program in Asia.

The research interests of Ming-sum include social work supervision, human service management, theory and practice of social work, social work education as well as substance abuse. He has published 176 pieces of research works, including 12 books (e.g., Social Work Supervision: Contexts and Concepts.  Sage, 2005) and 77 refereed journal articles. Ming-sum has been the most productive researcher in social work supervision worldwide since 2005. In the area of social work theory and practice, Ming-sum is the most productive author in International Social Work. His article “From resilience to resistance: A reconstruction of the strengths perspective in social work practice” received the Frank Turner Best Paper Award 2010 from International Social Work and is the most-downloaded social work article in the world. In addition, Ming-sum's editor's-choice article “Boundary of social work relationship revisited” in The British Journal of Social Work re-conceptualized the existing medical model of worker-client relationship into a more dynamic and inclusive model. Ming-sum is serving as the Co-Chief Editor of International Social Work and member of editorial board member and reviewer for nine other academic journals.

References

External links
 http://www.cihe.edu.hk/eng/academic/ss/staff.html

Hong Kong social scientists
Living people
Academic staff of Hong Kong Polytechnic University
McGill University School of Social Work alumni
University of Toronto alumni
Year of birth missing (living people)